Régis Laconi (born 8 July 1975 in Saint-Dizier, Haute-Marne) is a French former professional motorcycle racer. In  he competed in the Superbike World Championship for DFX on a Ducati.

Early career
Laconi has a French mother and Italian father. He started racing in 1991 in the French 125cc championship. He won this title in 1992, the French 250cc title a year later, and the European 250cc champion in 1994. For 1995 he went to the 250cc World Championship, but was never a front-runner in his two seasons there.

500cc
1997 was his first season on a 500cc Grand Prix bike, but his World Championship season was marred by injury, missing four rounds after being run over twice in a first-turn incident at the A1 Ring. With Red Bull backing he returned for 1998, riding a Yamaha for three years. He finished 10th, 11th and 12th in the series in this time, but won at Valencia in 1999

Superbike World Championship 
For  he was a factory Aprilia WSBK rider. He led the first lap of the season, but struggled for much of the season on circuits he did not know. Until the final round at Imola his best result was a 4th, but he benefitted from knowing this circuit (which, like himself, was new to WSBK after being familiar in 500cc). He qualified 2nd, and won the second race, after running strongly in race 1 before being taken out by a fall for champion Troy Bayliss.

He and team-mate James Toseland were clear favourites for the  title, which Toseland took at the final round of the season, in spite of Régis taking 5 poles and 7 wins, and having what is seen as the stronger team of mechanics. His  season was interrupted by injury, and for  he switched to Kawasaki PSG-1 Corse. He finished the season behind his two team-mates in the championship, taking 15th place, with Chris Walker in 9th and Fonsi Nieto in 10th.

At Misano the team ran in a localised San Marino livery, but unfortunately both he and team-mate Makoto Tamada crashed in race 1, forcing Laconi to run race 2 in the conventional green Kawasaki livery.

For 2009 Laconi switched to private Ducatis, riding the sole DFX machine. Results were strong early in the season, however he was seriously injured when he crashed heavily during the opening moments of the first practice of the Kyalami round of the World Superbike Championship. As of 20 May 2009 it was reported that Laconi awakened from his medically induced coma and is reported to have full movement in his arms, hands and legs. Laconi has undergone surgery to clasp his cervical vertebrae back together and it is expected he will remain immobile for some time.

Laconi returned for an exploratory test for the DFX Corse Ducati Team at Misano in June 2010 following his horrific crash at Kyalami in 2009. Regis had been training on his bicycle and after more than 70 laps with a best time of 1'37"800, he proved that his talent is still intact. But any thoughts of returning to racing for the moment are premature and totally groundless.The friendship that ties Regis to team manager Daniele Carli enabled the test to take place.

Career statistics

Grand Prix motorcycle racing

Races by year
(key) (Races in bold indicate pole position, races in italics indicate fastest lap)

Superbike World Championship

Races by year

References

External links

 sportnetwork.net Rider profile

1975 births
Living people
People from Saint-Dizier
French people of Italian descent
French motorcycle racers
MotoGP World Championship riders
Superbike World Championship riders
500cc World Championship riders
250cc World Championship riders
Sportspeople from Haute-Marne